Zapada columbiana is a species in the family Nemouridae ("spring stoneflies"), in the order Plecoptera ("stoneflies"). The species is known generally as the "Columbian forestfly".
It is found in North America.

References

Further reading

External links
NCBI Taxonomy Browser, Zapada columbiana

Nemouridae
Insects described in 1923